Walter Rubén Acuña (born 4 March 1992) is an Argentine professional footballer who plays as a forward for Deportivo Riestra.

Career
Acuña began his career with Primera B Nacional club Rosario Central, making two appearances during the club's promotion-winning season of 2012–13. In just his second Argentine Primera División match, Acuña scored his first career goal in a defeat to Vélez Sarsfield. In total, he made twenty appearances in the Primera División and scored five times. Midway through the 2015 campaign, Acuña was loaned out to Olimpo until the end of 2016. He participated in twenty-six matches and scored six goals. In July 2016, Acuña signed for Colón on loan. However, after two games, he returned to Rosario Central and was released.

In August 2017, Acuña joined Primera B Nacional side Juventud Unida. He made his Juventud debut on 24 September versus Guillermo Brown. Acuña sealed a transfer to Malta in August 2018 by signing for Ħamrun Spartans. However, the forward departed soon after; though did appear and score in a friendly match against Żejtun Corinthians on 5 August. Acuña subsequently returned to Argentina with Torneo Federal A's Villa Mitre, whom he would later go on to appear four times for. On 12 June 2019, Deportivo Riestra of Primera B Nacional was announced as Acuña's seventh career club; effective for 3 July.

Career statistics
.

Honours
Rosario Central
Primera B Nacional: 2012–13

References

External links

1992 births
Living people
People from San Nicolás de los Arroyos
Argentine footballers
Association football forwards
Argentine expatriate footballers
Expatriate footballers in Malta
Argentine expatriate sportspeople in Malta
Primera Nacional players
Argentine Primera División players
Torneo Federal A players
Rosario Central footballers
Olimpo footballers
Club Atlético Colón footballers
Juventud Unida de Gualeguaychú players
Ħamrun Spartans F.C. players
Villa Mitre footballers
Deportivo Riestra players
Sportspeople from Buenos Aires Province